There are at several political assemblies known as the Chamber of Representatives. Each one forms the lower house of a bicameral legislature.

Chamber of Representatives (France), the lower body of the French Parliament during the Hundred Days
Chamber of Representatives of Belarus
Chamber of Representatives (Belgium)
Chamber of Representatives of Colombia
Chamber of Representatives of Morocco
Chamber of Representatives of Uruguay